Aldridge Knight Bousfield (April 5, 1941 – October 4, 2020), known as "Pete", was an American mathematician working in algebraic topology, known for the concept of Bousfield localization.

Work and life
Bousfield obtained both his undergraduate degree (1963) and his doctorate (1966) at the Massachusetts Institute of Technology. His doctoral thesis, entitled "Higher Order Suspension Maps for Non-Additive Functors", was written under the supervision of Daniel Kan. He was a lecturer and assistant professor at Brandeis University and moved to the University of Illinois at Chicago where he worked from 1972 to his retirement in 2000.

Bousfield married Marie Vastersavendts, a Belgian mathematician, in 1968. She worked as demographer for the city of Chicago and died in 2016.

Research
Within algebraic topology, he specialised in homotopy theory. The Bousfield-Kan spectral sequence, Bousfield localization of spectra and model categories, and the Bousfield-Friedlander model structure are named after Bousfield (and Kan and Friedlander, respectively).

Recognition
He was named to the 2018 class of fellows of the American Mathematical Society "for contributions to homotopy theory and for exposition".

Selected publications

References 

20th-century American mathematicians
Massachusetts Institute of Technology School of Science alumni
1941 births
2020 deaths
Fellows of the American Mathematical Society
Writers from Boston
Brandeis University faculty
University of Illinois Chicago faculty